Cham Prasidh  (born 15 May 1951) is the Cambodian Minister of Industry, Science, Technology and Innovation. His Chinese name is 黃裕德虎. Mr Prasidh previously served as a Senior Minister and Minister of Commerce for 15 years. He is a member of the Cambodian People's Party and was elected to represent Siem Reap Province in the National Assembly of Cambodia in 2003.

Cham was born Ung You Teckhor to an ethnic Chinese family who were engaged in Entrepot trade. His father, Ung You Y, served as the member of parliament for Stung Treng province during Lon Nol's regime before the Khmer Rouge took over Cambodia.

After the 2013 general elections, the Ministry of Industry, Mines, and Energy was split into two separate ministries: the Ministry of Industry and the Handicrafts and Ministry of Mines and Energy with the reasoning that the scale of work was too big for one ministry to handle.

Notes

References

 Gottesman, Evans R., Cambodia After the Khmer Rouge: Inside the Politics of Nation Building, Silkworm Books, 2004, 

1951 births
Cambodian politicians of Chinese descent
Members of the National Assembly (Cambodia)
Living people
Cambodian People's Party politicians
Government ministers of Cambodia
People from Phnom Penh
Cambodian Theravada Buddhists
Royal University of Phnom Penh alumni